Ground system may refer to:
 Counterpoise (ground system), a non-radiating part of a radio antenna on or nearest the earth
 Ground (electricity), a reference point in an electrical circuit from which voltages are measured, or a common return path
 Ground segment, the ground-based components of a spacecraft system